Socialist Workers Party, now known as Socialist Workers Politics (Danish: Socialistisk Arbejderpolitik), is a Trotskyist political party in Denmark. SAP is the Danish section of the (reunified) Fourth International, and was founded in 1979 as a continuation of Revolutionære Socialisters Forbund (RSF) - Revolutionary Socialists' League.

SAP was a co-founder of the Red-Green Alliance in 1989 and its members are active within the Alliance.

SAP publishes the quarterly Socialistisk Information (SI).

In 2014 SAP replaced "Party" with "Politics" in their name, as they no longer contested elections.

References

External links
SAP and SI

1980 establishments in Denmark
Communist parties in Denmark
Fourth International (post-reunification)
Trotskyism in Denmark